Pandian Stores is a 2018 Indian Tamil language television series airing on Star Vijay. The show stars with an ensemble cast includes Sujitha, Stalin, V J Chitra, Kumaran Thangarajan, Hema Rajkumar, Venkat Renganathan, Saravana Vickram and VJ Deepika Lakshmanapandian with Sheela in the prominent roles. 

After VJ Chitra's demise on Dec.2020, her "Mullai" role was replaced by Kaavya Arivumani and followed by Lavanyaa. Also, VJ Deepika's "Aishu" role was initially played by Vaishali Taniga and replaced by Saai Gayathri Bhuvanesh and currently replaced back again by VJ Deepika.

Plot
Pandian's four sons (Sathyamoorthy, Jeevanandham, Kathiravan and Jayakannan) runs Pandian Stores, a famous grocery store in their town Kundrakudi.
Sathyamoorthy, the eldest son of the Pandiyan family, struggles to take care of his three kid brothers Jeeva, Kathir, and Kannan. He also lives with his widowed and Paralyzed mother Lakshmi. As Sathyamoorthy was engaged to his uncle Murugan's elder daughter Malli, who is not interested in marrying him as he is poor and elopes during the Wedding day.

Dhanalakshmi, A well educated courageous girl enters the life of Sathyamoorthy against her family's wishes and leads the Pandian stores family to get well settled. She raised her Brothers-in-law as her own sons.

Many Years later, Jeeva, Kathir and Kannan are now adults. Jeeva gets engaged to Malli's younger sister, Mullai, who loves him since her childhood. But, Jeeva was in love with his collegemate Meenakshi who comes from a rich family. So, Mullai gets married to Kathir instead of Jeeva. Kannan, the last son of the family, elopes with Dhanam's sister-in-law's adopted daughter Aishwarya. The rest of the story concentrates on the incidents that happens at joint family.

The story revolves around Dhanam, about how she unites the joint family after the entry of the new Daughters-in-law, Meena, Mullai and Aishwarya.

Cast

Main
Stalin Muthu as Sathyamoorthy aka Moorthy – Lakshmi and Pandian's eldest son; Jeeva, Kathir and Kannan's brother; Dhanam's husband; Lakshman's father. 
Sujitha as Dhanalakshmi aka Dhanam – Varadarajan and Kamakshi's daughter; Jaga's sister; Moorthy's wife; Lakshman's mother. 
Venkat Renganathan as Jeevanandham aka Jeeva – Lakshmi and Pandian's second son; Moorthy, Kathir and Kannan's brother; Meena's husband; Kayal's father.
 Hema Raj Sathish (2018- present) as Meenakshi aka Meena – Janarthanan's elder daughter; Jeeva's wife; Kayal's mother.
 Kavitha Gowda (Oct.2018) made a cameo appearance as Meena (Replaced by Hema)
Kumaran Thangarajan as Kathiravan aka Kathir – Lakshmi and Pandian's third son; Moorthy, Jeeva and Kannan's brother; Mullai's husband.
VJ Chitra (2018-Dec.2020) as Mullai – Muruganandham and Parvathy's younger daughter; Malli's sister; Aishu's cousin; Kathir's wife.
 Kaavya Arivumani (2021-2022) as Mullai (Sudden Replacement of Chitra due to her death)
 Lavanyaa (2023- present) as Mullai (Replacement of Kaavya)
 Saravana Vickram as Jayakannan aka Kannan – Lakshmi and Pandian's youngest son; Moorthy, Jeeva and Kathir's brother; Aishu's husband. 
 VJ Deepika Lakshmananpandian (2021;2023- present) as Aishwarya aka Aishu – Kasthuri's sister's daughter; Mullai's cousin; Kannan's wife.
 Vaishali Taniga (2020) as Aishwarya (Replaced by Deepika)
 Saai Gayathri Bhuvanesh (2021-2023) as Aishwarya (Temporary Replacement of Deepika)

Supporting 
 Sheela as Lakshmi – Muruganandham's sister; Pandian's widow; Moorthy, Jeeva, Kathir and Kannan's mother; Lakshman and Kayal's grandmother. (2018-2021) (Dead) 
 Shanthi Williams as "Pillaiyar Patti" Parvathy – Muruganandham's wife; Malli and Mullai's mother; Kasthuri's aunt. 
 S.T.P. Rosary as Muruganandham aka Murugan – Lakshmi's brother; Parvathy's husband; Malli and Mullai's father.
 David Solomon Raja as Jaganathan aka Jaga – Varadarajan and Kamakshi's son; Dhanalakshmi's brother; Moorthy's best friend; Kasthuri's husband. 
 Meena Sellamuthu as Kasthuri – Jaga's wife; Akash's mother
 Sumangali as Kamakshi – Varadarajan's wife; Jaganathan and Dhanalakshmi's mother
 Venkat Subha / Ravi Chandran as Janardhanan – Meena's father; Kalaivani's husband. 
 Sri Vidhya Shankar as Kalaivani – Meena's mother; Janarthanan's wife
 Harsha Nair as Mallika aka Malli – Muruganandham and Parvathy's elder daughter; Mullai's sister; Bhaskar's widow; Prashant's step-mother; Moorthy's ex-fiancée. 
 Vasanth Vasi / Mahesh Subramanian  as Prashanth – Bhaskar's son; Malli's step-son; Aishu's ex-fiancé; Shwetha's fiancé
 Vinuja Vijay / Keerthi Vijay / Bhavyashree as Shwetha – Meena's cousin; Kalaivani's niece; Prashant's fiancée
 Yogeshwaran as Senthilnathan: Kathir's best friend and Padma's husband
 Myna Nandhini as Padma Senthilnathan: Senthilnathan's wife 
 Kowsalya Senthamarai as Naagalakshmi: Meena and Swetha's grandmother; Kalaivani's mother 
 Nellai Siva (2018-2021) → Theni Murugan (2022- present) as Kumaresan: A friend and faithful employee of Pandian Stores.
 Sathya Sai Krishnan as Meherunissa: Kannan's ex-love interest is also his neighbour. She is a Muslim girl.
 Gokul Krishnan as Saravanan: A worker in Pandian Stores and Kathir's friend (2018–present)
 Deepa as Selvi: Moorthy, Jeeva, Kathir and Kannan's cousin sister (2018–2020)
 Madhan as Maheshwaran: Kathir and Senthil's best friend and Rathi's husband (2020)
 Akshaya as Rathi Maheshwaran: Mahesh's wife (2020)
 Baby Hema as Harshita: Selvi's daughter (2019–2020)
 Master Nikhil as Aakash: Jaganathan and Kasthuri's son; Aishwarya's cousin brother, Kamakshi's grandson (2018)
 Jayanthi Narayanan as Kasthuri's mother; Aishwarya and Akash's grandmother (2018– present)
 Baby George as Vasuki: Kasthuri's elder sister and Aishwarya's mother (Dead) (2019)
 Jeya Lakshmi as Begum: Meher's mother (2020)
 Prakash Rajan as Sethupathi
 Rajashekar as Pandian
 Sulakshana as Raasathi
 R. Aravindraj as Varadarajan
 Krishna Kumar as Bashkar

Reception

Critics
The Indian Express quoted the series as "A simple serial with no violence, hostility, envy!".

Ratings
The highest TRP in week 36 the special episode of the character Meena's baby shower aired on 11 September 2020, garnered 11.462 million impressions becoming the most watched Tamil GEC program of the week and the first Star Vijay program to enter the top five. The special three-hour episode of the naming ceremony of Meena's baby aired on 23 November 2020 in week 49 garnered 10.987 million impressions occupying third position.

Production

Casting
Kavitha Gowda was signed to play the role Meenakshi (Meena), But left the serial after making only a promo appearance. She was then replaced by Hema Rajkumar.  Venkat Subha had played the role Jagannathan. But after his death, He was replaced by Ravichandran.
Chitra Kamaraj acted in the role of Mullai. She was replaced by Kaavya Arivumani due to her sudden demise. However, in October 2022, Kavya announced her exit in the serial and was replaced by Lavanya who is currently playing the role of Mullai.  Nellai Siva, a well known supporting actor, played the role Kumaresan, His character was written out of the serial after his death due to COVID-19. The role Aishwarya was initially played by Vaishali Taniga. She left the role in December 2020. After that VJ Deepika Lakshmanapandian replaced her until September 2021. After that the role was given to Sai Gayathri but VJ Deepika came back in March 2023 as Aishwarya.

Filming
Due to the COVID-19 outbreak in India, Pandian Stores, and all other Indian television series and films production were suspended from 27 March 2020. The show commenced telecasting new episodes from 27 July 2020.

Crossovers and special episodes
 On 11 September 2020, Pandian Stores held a three-hour non-stop special episode titled Pandian Stores: Kudumba Valaikappu Vizha for Meena's baby shower.
 On 23 November 2020, Pandian Stores Kulandaiyin Peyar Suttum Vizha held a three-hour non-stop special episode for Meena's Baby's name function.
 On 29 and 30 April 2021, Pandian Stores held two-and-a-half-hour non-stop special episodes titled Pandian Stores: Sathyamoorthy Dhanam Thirumana Vaibogam for Moorthy and Dhanam Marriage.
 From 22 to 27 July 2021, Pandian Stores celebrated Dhanalakshmi's baby shower.
 On 2019, Pandian Stores had a week of crossover episodes with Bharathi Kannamma (episodes 327–331).
 On 2021, Pandian Stores had crossover episodes with Baakiyalakshmi from February 5 to February 28.
 It had a crossover with Thamizhum Saraswathiyhum from November 15, 2021, to November 28, 2021.

Adaptations

References

External links
Pandian Stores at Hotstar
Pandian Stores on IMDb

Star Vijay original programming
Tamil-language television soap operas
Tamil-language romance television series
2018 Tamil-language television series debuts
Television shows set in Tamil Nadu
Television series about families